Marine Resource Economics is a quarterly peer-reviewed academic journal covering the economics of natural resource use in the global marine environment. It is published by the University of Chicago Press in affiliation with the North American Association of Fisheries Economists and the International Institute of Fisheries Economics and Trade. The current editor is Joshua K. Abbott of Arizona State University. According to the Journal Citation Reports, the journal has a 2017 impact factor of 1.851.

Most-cited papers 
According to Google Scholar, the following three papers have been cited most often: 
 Holland, Daniel S., and Richard J. Brazee. "Marine reserves for fisheries management." Marine Resource Economics 11.3 (1996): 157-171.
Hannesson, Rögnvaldur. "Marine reserves: what would they accomplish?." Marine Resource Economics 13.3 (1998): 159-170.
Ruddle, Kenneth, Edvard Hviding, and Robert E. Johannes. "Marine resources management in the context of customary tenure." Marine Resource Economics 7.4 (1992): 249-273.

See also 
 Environmental resources management
 Marine ecosystem

References

External links
 

Economics journals
Resource economics
Quarterly journals
Publications established in 1984
English-language journals
Environmental social science journals